Jane Win-Shih Liu is a Chinese-American computer scientist known for her work on real-time computing. She is a professor emerita at the University of Illinois at Urbana–Champaign, Shun Hing Honorary Chair Professor of Computer Science at National Tsing Hua University, a distinguished visiting fellow of the Academia Sinica, and the former editor-in-chief of IEEE Transactions on Computers.

Education and career
Liu majored in electrical engineering at Cleveland State University, and completed a doctorate at the Massachusetts Institute of Technology in 1968. Her dissertation, Reliability of Quantum Mechanical Communication Systems, was supervised by Robert Spayde Kennedy.

She was a member of the faculty at the University of Illinois at Urbana–Champaign from 1972 until her retirement in 2000. During this time, she was editor-in-chief of IEEE Transactions on Computers from 1996 to 1999. She worked for Microsoft from 2000 to 2004, when she joined the Academia Sinica.

Books
Liu is the author of the book Real-Time Systems (Prentice-Hall, 2000), and co-author with C. L. Liu of Linear Systems Analysis (McGraw-Hill, 1975).

Recognition
Liu was elected as an IEEE Fellow in 1995 "for contributions to real-time task scheduling methods for computing systems". The IEEE Technical Committee on Real-Time Systems gave her their Technical Achievement Award in 2005. In 2008, the Taiwan Institute of Information and Computing Machinery gave her their Information Science Honorary Medal.

Personal life
Liu was married to Dave C.-L. Liu (1934–2020), with whom she founded and co-directed the Real Time and Embedded System Laboratory at the University of Illinois.

References

External links
Home page

Year of birth missing (living people)
Living people
American computer scientists
American women computer scientists
Chinese computer scientists
Chinese women computer scientists
Cleveland State University alumni
Massachusetts Institute of Technology alumni
University of Illinois Urbana-Champaign faculty
Academic staff of the National Tsing Hua University
Fellow Members of the IEEE
American women academics
21st-century American women